Flom is a surname. Notable people with the surname include:

Chaim Flom (died 2008), Israeli rabbi
George T. Flom (1871–1960), American linguist
Jason Flom (born 1960/61), American music industry executive, podcaster, and philanthropist
Joseph H. Flom (1923–2011), American lawyer